The Thomas Maynard House is a historic home located at New London, Frederick County, Maryland, United States. It is a large -story, gable-roofed Georgian residence of random-coursed stone built about 1809.

The Thomas Maynard House was listed on the National Register of Historic Places in 1979.

References

External links
, including photo from 1977, at Maryland Historical Trust

Houses completed in 1809
Houses in Frederick County, Maryland
Houses on the National Register of Historic Places in Maryland
Georgian architecture in Maryland
National Register of Historic Places in Frederick County, Maryland